Oyem Athletic Club are a football club based in Oyem, Woleu-Ntem Province, Gabon.

The club won promotion to the Gabon Championnat National D2 by winning the third level Championship in 2015. The club later won promotion to the top tier in 2017.

References 

Football clubs in Gabon